An American Stranger is the debut album from indie rock band The Upwelling, released on August 25, 2009. It was released after the band was signed to Edmond Records, owned by The All-American Rejects, in partnership with Doghouse Records and Warner Bros.

Track listing

Personnel 

 Sean Beresford – engineer, mixing
 Steve Hardy – mixing
 Conor Heffernan – organ, piano, keyboards, vocals, arp
 Jason Hill – vocals, producer, engineer
 Ari Ingber – bass, guitar, percussion, piano, keyboards, programming, vocals, producer
 Stephan Jenkins – guitar, vocals, producer
 Vlado Meller – mastering
 Daniel Mendez – engineer
 Mike Mulieri – engineer
 Mark Plati – producer, engineer
 Tyson Ritter – bass, guitar, percussion, vocals, producer
 Brian Sperber – producer, engineer, mixing

References 

The Upwelling albums
2009 albums